Chaudhary Muhammad Amin Zulqernain is a Pakistani politician who had been a member of the Provincial Assembly of the Punjab from August 2018 till May 2022.
Also Appointed as Parliamentary Secretary Punjab for Cooperatives Department in April 2019.

Political career

Previously elected as Naib Nazim Gulberg Town / Garden Town (Lahore) as independent Candidate then joined PML (Q) in 2005.

Joined Pakistan Pakistan Tehreek-e-Insaf in 2011.

He was elected to the Provincial Assembly of the Punjab as a candidate of Pakistan Tehreek-e-Insaf from Constituency PP-170 (Lahore-XXVII) in 2018 Pakistani general election.

He ran for seat of MPA from Lahore PP-170 and won the election against PML N candidate with the lead of more than 5000.

Appointed as parliamentary Secretary Punjab for Cooperatives Department on 15 April 2019. He was de-seated due to voting against party candidate for Chief Minister and therefore, violating party policy.

Education

Personal life Information 
Born on 21st August 1977 Muhammad Amin Zulqarnain grew up in Lahore, Pakistan.

At a young age Amin proved to be a successful businessman and started his political career in his early 20’s.

References

2. https://www.pap.gov.pk/members/profile/en/21/1416

Living people
Pakistan Tehreek-e-Insaf MPAs (Punjab)
Year of birth missing (living people)